The Château d'Osthoffen is a château developed from an older castle situated in the commune of Osthoffen in the département of Bas-Rhin of France, located about 15 kilometres from Strasbourg. It is dated to the 12th or 13th century.

It has been listed since 1963 as a monument historique by the French Ministry of Culture.

See also
List of castles in France

References

External links
 

Buildings and structures completed in the 13th century
Ruined castles in Bas-Rhin
Châteaux in Bas-Rhin
Monuments historiques of Bas-Rhin